Giovanni Bottesini (22 December 1821 – 7 July 1889) was an Italian Romantic composer, conductor, and a double bass virtuoso.

Biography

Born in Crema, Lombardy, he was taught the rudiments of music by his father, an accomplished clarinetist and composer, at a young age and had played timpani in Crema with the Teatro Sociale before the age of eleven. He studied violin with Carlo Cogliati, and probably would have continued on this instrument except for a unique turn of events. His father sought a place for him in the Milan Conservatory in 1835, but due to the Bottesini family's lack of money, Bottesini needed a scholarship. Only two positions were available: double bass and bassoon. He prepared a successful audition for the double bass scholarship in a matter of weeks. At the conservatory, he studied with Luigi Rossi, to whom he would later dedicate his Tre grandi duetti per contrabasso. Only four years later, a surprisingly short time by the standards of the day, he left with a prize of 300 francs for solo playing. This money financed the acquisition of an instrument of Carlo Giuseppe Testore, and a globe-trotting career as "the Paganini of the Double Bass" was launched.

On leaving Milan, he spent some time in America and also occupied the position of principal double-bass in the Italian opera at Havana, where he later became director. Here his first opera, Cristoforo Colombo, was produced in 1847. In 1849 he made his first appearance in England, playing double bass solos at one of the Musical Union concerts. After this he made frequent visits to England, and his extraordinary command of his unwieldy instrument gained him great popularity in London and the provinces.

Apart from his triumphs as a performer, Bottesini was a conductor of European reputation, and was conductor at the Théâtre des Italiens in Paris from 1855 to 1857 where his second opera, L'Assedio di Firenze, was produced in 1856. In 1861 and 1862 he conducted in Palermo, supervising the production of his opera Marion Delorme in 1862, and in 1863 in Barcelona. During these years he diversified the toils of conducting by repeated concert tours through Europe. In 1871 he conducted a season of Italian opera at the Lyceum theatre in London, during which his opera Ali Babà was produced, and he was chosen by Verdi to conduct the first performance of Aida, which took place at Cairo on 24 December 1871.

When conducting opera, Bottesini would frequently bring his double bass on stage during the intermission to play fantasies on the evening's opera. His fantasies on Lucia di Lammermoor, I puritani and Beatrice di Tenda are virtuosic tours de force that are still popular with those who are highly accomplished on the instrument.

Bottesini wrote three operas besides those previously mentioned: Il Diavolo della Notte (Milan, 1859); Vinciguerra (Paris, 1870); and Ero e Leandro (Turin, 1880), the last named to a libretto by Arrigo Boito, which was subsequently set by Luigi Mancinelli. He also wrote The Garden of Olivet, a devotional oratorio (libretto by Joseph Bennett), which was produced at the Norwich festival in 1887, eleven string quartets, a quintet for string quartet and double bass, and many works for the double bass, including two concertos for solo double bass, the Gran Duo Concertante (originally) for two double basses, Passione Amorosa for two double basses, numerous pieces for double bass and piano, and an instructional book ("Complete Method for Double Bass").

Shortly before his death, in 1888 he was appointed director of Parma Conservatory on Verdi's recommendation. Bottesini died in Parma on 7 July 1889. His solo works remain standard repertoire for accomplished double bassists to this day. Bottesini was a freemason, initiated 20 June 1849, in the Bank of England Lodge No. 263, London.

The Paganini of the double bass

Bottesini was widely acclaimed, and his virtuosic skill in the bass paralleled that of Paganini himself on the violin. Because of the contributions of Bottesini (along with those of Sperger and Dragonetti) to bass technique, many have come to view the double bass as a diverse and versatile instrument. Most notably there are many virtuoso bass players who draw inspiration from the early renaissance of the double bass.

Bottesini's bass was said to be a unique instrument with a remarkable sound. It was built by Carlo Antonio Testore in 1716. The instrument was owned by several unknown bass players. It nearly met its end in the 1830s as it sat backstage in a marionette theater in Milan. Bottesini purchased the Testore in 1838 for 900 lire. The Testore bass was later converted back to a four-stringed instrument, and then to a three. Eventually, it was changed back to a four-string configuration and is now in the possession of a private collector in Japan. Bottesini was also one of the first performers to adopt the French-style bow grip for the double bass. This style was previously used solely by violinists, violists and cellists.

List of selected works

Selected works for solo double bass
Adagio melanconico e appassionato
Allegretto Capriccio "Alla Chopin"
Allegro di Concerto "Alla Mendelssohn" (aka "Gran Allegro")
Capriccio Di Bravura
Concerto Di Bravura No.1 [Concerto No.1] (1840)
Concerto/Concertino No. 2 in B minor for double bass and orchestra [Concerto No.2] (1853)
Concerto in F minor [Concerto No.3] (1871) for double bass and orchestra. Accidentally miscredited or published as concerto No.1 (also known as Concerto for Students in some publications/arrangements/lower transpositions, studienkonzert in German publications)
Gran Duo Concertante
Gran Duo for clarinet in A and bass and orchestra
 Duo for cello and double bass – Rossini
Elegia in re no. 1
Elegia No. 2, "Romanza Drammatica" 
Elegia No. 3, "Romanza Patetica"
Fantasia sulla "Beatrice di Tenda" di Bellini
Fantasia sulla "Cerrito"
Fantasia sulla "La Sonnambula" di Bellini
Fantasia sulla "Norma" di Bellini
Fantasia sulla "Straniera" di Bellini
Fantasia sulla "Lucia de Lammermoor" di Gaetano Donizetti
Fantasia sulla "I Puritani" di Bellini
Gran Duo Passione Amorosa per due contrabassi
Introduzione e Bolero
Introduzione e Fuge
Introduzione e Gavotta
Introduzione e Variazione di "Carnivale di Venezia" di Rossini
Meditazione (Aria di Bach) (an arrangement of the Air from Bach's Orchestral Suite in D major)
Melodia No. 1
Melodia No. 2
Rêverie (originally for violoncello and orchestra)
Tarantella in la minore (frequently paired with Elegia No. 1 and referred to as Elegia e Tarantella. Numerous manuscripts by Bottesini himself show that these two pieces were clearly intended to be performed together)
Tre gran due per contrabassi 
Variazione sulla "Shane Savage" di Benjamin Kremer

Other chamber music
Tutto il mondo serra – soprano, double bass and piano
Un Bacio solo – soprano, double bass and piano
Guardami ancor – soprano, double bass and piano
È il pianto del mio cor – soprano, double bass and piano
Canta Roberto! – soprano, double bass and piano
Retourner a la paix des champs – soprano, double bass and piano
Une bouche Aimée – soprano, double bass and piano
Duetto – clarinet, double bass and piano

Notes

References

External links
The Bottesini Urtext Project
Bottesini's Catalogue
Books and Resources on Bottesini

"Bottesini, Giovanni", by Alberto Pironti, Dizionario Biografico degli Italiani, via Treccani
bottesini.com

Complete Method for Double Bass by Bottesini
In Search of Bottesini, Thomas and George Martin

1821 births
1889 deaths
19th-century classical composers
19th-century conductors (music)
Composers for double bass
Honorary Members of the Royal Philharmonic Society
Italian classical composers
Italian classical double-bassists
Italian conductors (music)
Italian male conductors (music)
Italian male classical composers
Italian Romantic composers
Male double-bassists
Milan Conservatory alumni
People from Crema, Lombardy